Longshu (Mandarin: 永新镇) is a town in Santai County, Mianyang, Sichuan, China. In 2010, Longshu had a total population of 16,791: 8,818 males and 7,973 females: 2,317 aged under 14, 12,506 aged between 15 and 65 and 1,968 aged over 65.

References 

Towns in Sichuan
Santai County